Nikola Zlatanov (born 3 September 1961) is a Bulgarian rower. He competed in the men's eight event at the 1988 Summer Olympics.

He moved to France, and now he is a trainer at the Sporting Dunkerquois, a French rowing club of Dunkerque.

References

External links
 

1961 births
Living people
Bulgarian male rowers
Olympic rowers of Bulgaria
Rowers at the 1988 Summer Olympics
Rowers from Sofia